Rabbi Moshe Stern (1914-1997) was a prominent Orthodox Jewish (Charedi) Rabbi in the  20th century. He was Dayan of Debrecen, Hungary and author of a halachic responsa sefer named Be'er Moshe. He survived Bergen Belsen during the Holocaust and after a brief stint in Buenos Aires, became Rabbi of Kahal Yesodei HaTorah in New York where he published Be'er Moshe.

References

1914 births
1997 deaths
Hungarian Orthodox rabbis
Bergen-Belsen concentration camp survivors
20th-century Hungarian rabbis
Authors of books on Jewish law
20th-century American rabbis